Who Wants to Be a Millionaire? is the Irish version of the British quiz show Who Wants to Be a Millionaire? which aired on RTÉ One from 2000 to 2002. It was presented by Gay Byrne. The format was the same as on the British show, and the 15 incremental prize amounts had the same numeric values, from 100 up to 1,000,000. These values were denominated in Irish pounds in 2000 and 2001, and in euros in 2002, after the euro changeover.

The series will be available on RTÉ Player to celebrate 60 years of television from Christmas 2021.

Production
The Irish version was made by Tyrone Productions under license from Celador, the British originators. The stage, music, and format were identical to the original British format. The quizmaster was Gay Byrne, who was famous as the longtime host of The Late Late Show, and was making one of several returns from retirement.

The top prize fell from IR£1m (€1,269,738) to €1m after the euro changeover at the beginning of 2002. The prize money was funded by a combination of a premium-rate telephone number which candidates had to ring to be selected as contestants, and £7m from headline sponsor eircell, which was then eircom's mobile phone subsidiary company. As part of the sale to Vodafone Eircell was rebranded in 2001, as part of this re-brand the series was sponsored by Eircell Vodafone, this was the only use of the Vodafone brand on the series.

Initially the series aired on Friday and Tuesday night, with the Tuesday night episode split between an episode of the Irish soap opera Fair City. The show had several runs over consecutive Sunday evenings. After two years the initial sponsorship contract ended.

RTÉ and the Irish National Lottery company were in discussion about bring the series back as it had been put on hiatus following the loss of its main sponsor in 2002, the National Lottery said that no decision had been made but it was always a possibility, RTÉ axed the series fully in the summer of 2003 and the series not making a return for the 2003–04 season.

The top prize was never won; the biggest win was IR£250,000, won by Roger Dowds of Glasnevin in January 2001.

Specials 
Two types of specials were produced. A Celebrity edition and a generations edition.

Lunula controversy
In June 2001, contestant Shane O'Doherty was asked, as the 13th (£250,000) question, in what part of the body the lunula was. He used his phone-a-friend lifeline to ring a physician, who said it was in the heart, which was the answer he then gave. The desired answer was the fingernail, and so O'Doherty's winnings fell from £125,000 back to the guaranteed £32,000.  In fact, a lunula is any crescent or moon-shaped structure, including both the white base of the fingernail and the segments of the semilunar heart valves. O'Doherty protested that, since both answers were correct, he should not have been eliminated. He threatened to sue the producers, and the controversy generated media debate for two weeks. Eventually he was allowed to return to the show. He was asked another question, and opted to pass and keep the £125,000 he had previously accrued. The replacement question was also criticised as flawed; it described John Pius Boland as an "Olympic gold medallist" even though the medals received by winners at the 1896 Olympics were actually silver.

Money trees

References

2000 Irish television series debuts
2002 Irish television series endings
Irish quiz shows
Irish television series based on British television series
RTÉ original programming
Who Wants to Be a Millionaire?